A. Soriano Corporation (ANSCOR) is a holding company in the Philippines with diversified investments. It was incorporated on February 13, 1930 by Andrés Soriano, Sr.

Current companies
Industrial:
 AG&P International Holdings Ltd.  
 Phelps Dodge Philippines Energy Products Corporation 
 Tayabas Geothermal Power, Inc.

Services:
 Cirrus Global, Inc.
 Element Data
 Island Aviation, Inc. 
 Madaket Healthcare
 Pamalican Resort, Inc.
 Prople Limited
 Y-mAbs Therapeutics, Inc.

Property:
 ANSCOR Property Holdings, Inc. 
 Seven Seas Resorts and Leisure, Inc. (Amanpulo Resort)
 KSA Realty Corporation (The Enterprise Center)
 Fremont Holdings, Inc.

References

External links
 A. Soriano Corporation
 The Andres Soriano Foundation

Holding companies of the Philippines
Holding companies established in 1930
Companies listed on the Philippine Stock Exchange
Companies based in Makati